Sung-mi, also spelled Seong-mi or Song-mi, is a Korean feminine given name. Its meaning differs based on the hanja used to write each syllable of the name. There are 27 hanja with the reading "sung" and 33 hanja with the reading "mi" on the South Korean government's official list of hanja which may be registered for use in given names; they are displayed in the table at right.

People with the name include:
Hong Sung-mi (born 1986), stage name Dana (South Korean singer)
Michelle Wie (Korean name Wie Seong-mi, born 1989), American golfer of Korean descent
Yun Song-mi (born 1992), North Korean football defender

Fictional characters with the name include:
Ji Seong-mi, character played by Im Seo-yeon in 2009 South Korean television series Three Brothers
Ma Seong-mi, character played by Kim Min-hee in 2012 South Korean television series I Do, I Do
Sungmi, character played by Naomi Ko in 2014 American satirical drama film Dear White People

See also
List of Korean given names

References

Korean feminine given names